Aussa or Awsa can refer to 
 the Sultanate of Aussa
 Asaita, a city also called Aussa

See also
American Woman Suffrage Association, AWSA